The Pulse Of Decay is Hades Almighty's last studio album.

Reception

Sputnik Music writes in a review: 
"On their early albums Hades Almighty played Viking black metal similar to bands like Enslaved or early Satyricon. With this release they completely change their style to where they sound nothing like they used to. On The Pulse of Decay, the band plays experimental black metal. They mix their usual black metal style with elements of industrial, ambient, and doom metal. The guitarists play a couple different styles. They're either playing the fast black metal tremolo picking, slow doom riffs, or very technical riffs. Not tech death style technical, but technical enough for a black metal album. The bass is surprisingly audible on this album as well. This is obviously very odd for black metal and to tell you the truth I really don't know how to describe the bass very well because it's usually inaudible on most albums I listen to. Drumming on this album is handled by a man named Remi Andersen and his style of drumming also not your typical black metal style. There are almost no blast beats on this album and while they are present, they're not the main style like on most black metal albums. The drumming is pretty fast, but not in the form of blast beats. While the more slow, doomy parts are going the drummer does a great job of keeping the pace of the song. This is album is also kind of melodic. Keyboards are present throughout the album, and while they're not a main focus, you can tell they are there and they keep this album feeling very melodic and not just like another black metal album."

Track listing
216 / Cataclysmic - 1:26
Submission Equals Suicide - 4:26
The Pulse of Decay - 5:35
Antichrist Inside - 4:21
Vendetta Assassination - 4:09
Apocalypse - 6:42
Razor - 6:25

Musicians and production
 Jan Otto "Janto" Garmanslund (vocals/bass/keyboards)
 Jørn Inge Tunsberg (guitar/keyboards)
 Remi (drums / backing vocals)

References

2001 albums
Psycho Bitch Records albums
Hades Almighty albums